Ponta das Bicudas is a headland in the southeastern part of the island of Santiago, Cape Verde. It is 3 km east of the city centre of Praia, near the neighbourhood Achada Grande Tras. The Praia Harbour lies west of the headland.

References

Headlands of Cape Verde
Geography of Santiago, Cape Verde
Praia